Heiligenroth is an Ortsgemeinde – a community belonging to a Verbandsgemeinde – in the Westerwaldkreis in Rhineland-Palatinate, Germany.

Geography

The village lies roughly 3 km from Montabaur. In the immediate vicinity are found Ruppach-Goldhausen, Boden, Staudt, Wirzenborn and Großholbach. The community belongs to the Verbandsgemeinde of Montabaur, a kind of collective municipality.

Politics

Community council
The council is made up of 17 council members, including the extraofficial mayor (Bürgermeister), who were elected in a municipal election on 7 June 2009.

Coat of arms
The approval to bear a coat of arms was granted by the government assistant on 21 March 1980. In the arms are a red watchtower on a silver background, and a golden lion rampant on a blue background. The watchtower still stands today in Heiligenroth. Formerly it stood alone, with a small church beside it. Only in 1782 was the church that stands today built onto the Romanesque tower. At that time, the tower served a defensive function, hence the loopholes, and it belonged until 1975 to the community, while the church belonged to the parish. It was only then that the tower's ownership passed to the parish.

The choice of Nassau tinctures has not as much to do with the short political connection with the Duchy of Nassau (1802–1866) as it has to do with Heiligenroth's location, which is in the middle of the Nassauer Land. So the Nassau Nature Park begins in Heiligenroth, and even the Bundeswehr soldiers stationed in Montabaur bore Nassau's arms – the golden lion rampant on a blue background – on the left sleeve.

Culture and sightseeing

Clubs
The community's clubs are a women's choir, a volunteer fire brigade, MGV Hoffnung (men's singing club), a mandolin club, a Möhnenverein (a “foolish women’s club” dedicated to Carnival festivities), a music club, a sport club and a tennis club.

Economy and infrastructure
The community lies in the Westerwald south of the A 3, right near the Montabaur interchange. The community's industrial park is separated from the main centre by this Autobahn, lying to its north. While the Cologne-Frankfurt high-speed rail line was being built, the community was also shielded by a noise barrier. The so-called industrial park (Industriegebiet) busies itself mainly in supplying the area with various service and shopping facilities such as supermarkets, a building centre, a furniture warehouse and filling stationss. There are also production businesses there.

Among public institutions there are one kindergarten, a fire brigade, playgrounds, a sporting ground with clubhouse and a beach volleyball court, a parochial centre, the Vogelsanghalle (“Birdsong Hall”) with a bowling alley for major events, the community administration with a youth centre, four tennis courts and a clubhouse, and a Catholic parish church.

References

Municipalities in Rhineland-Palatinate
Westerwaldkreis